Caldwell Creek may refer to:

Caldwell Creek (Logan Creek), a stream in Missouri
Caldwell Creek (St. Francis River), a stream in Missouri
Caldwell Creek (Pennsylvania), a stream in Pennsylvania

See also
Caldwell